Scyphanthus is a genus of ornamental plants in the family Loasaceae.

References

External links
The Taxonomicon:Scyphanthus

Loasaceae
Cornales genera